Larry Silver (born 1934) is an American photographer. He was born in the Bronx. While a student at the High School of Industrial Art in Manhattan he met members of the Photo League, among them Lou Bernstein, W. Eugene Smith and Weegee. He won a first prize in the Scholastic-Ansco Photography Awards, and a scholarship to the Art Center School in Los Angeles. Silver takes black-and-white photographs, mainly documenting the places he has lived: Santa Monica Beach, California; New York City; and Westport, Connecticut.

Silver's work is in various museum collections including those of the Metropolitan Museum of Art,  the Brooklyn Museum, the George Eastman House, the Whitney Museum of American Art, the Boston Museum of Fine Arts, and the Minneapolis Institute of Arts. His work has been shown in many solo and group exhibitions.

References

Further reading
 Larry Silver (1985). Muscle Beach, California 1954. New York: International Center for Photography.
 Ann Clements Borum (1991). 10,000 Eyes: The American Society of Magazine Photographers' Celebration of the 150th Anniversary of Photography.  [Rochester, NY]: Professional Photography Division, Eastman Kodak Company
 Ellen Dugan (1992). This Sporting Life: 1878–1991. Atlanta, GA: High Museum of Art
 Vicki Goldberg, Robert B Silberman (1999). American photography: a century of images. San Francisco, California: Chronicle Books
 Anne Tucker (2001). This was the Photo League: Compassion and the camera from the Depression to the Cold War. Chicago: Stephen Daiter Gallery
 [s.n.] (2002). Larry Silver: Suburban Vision.  New York: Bruce Silverstein Gallery
 Reuel Golden (2010). New York: Portrait of a City. Köln: Taschen
 Mason Klein, Catherine Evans (2011). The Radical Camera: New York's Photo League, 1936-1951.  New York: The Jewish Museum and New Haven, Connecticut: Yale University Press

External links 
 Larry Silver Photographs at the New-York Historical Society

American photographers
Living people
1934 births
High School of Art and Design alumni
Photographers from the Bronx